Haste  may refer to:

 Haste, Germany, a municipality in the district of Schaumburg in Lower Saxony
 USS Haste (PG-92), a Canadian corvette turned over to the United States Navy and manned by the Coast Guard
 Haste (album), a 2012 album by Veryan Weston, Ingrid Laubrock and Hannah Marshall

People with the surname
 Carl Cohn Haste (1874–1939), a Danish pianist, organist and composer
 Jeff Haste, a former member of the Pennsylvania House of Representatives
 Shane Haste (born 1985), Australian professional wrestler